N90 may refer to:
 N-90 National Highway, in Pakistan
 N90 statistic
 New York TRACON, an air traffic control facility
 Ngandi language
 NGC 602, a star cluster
 Nikon N90, a camera
 Nokia N90, a smartphone
 Toyota Hilux (N90), a pickup truck